The Gajtan cave is a natural monument in Gajtan, Albania, Albania.

References

Caves of Albania
Geography of Shkodër County